Leland Franklin Wolf Sr. (January 16, 1903 – July 21, 1987) was an American politician.

Wolf was born in Hinton, Oklahoma, and graduated from Noble High School before attending the University of Oklahoma. He won his first election to the Oklahoma House of Representatives in 1952, and retired in 1974. On June 22, 1987, Wolf suffered a cerebral hemorrhage. The condition led to pneumonia, and he died on July 21, 1987, aged 84, while seeking medical treatment in Norman.

References

1903 births
1987 deaths
Deaths from pneumonia in Oklahoma
People from Caddo County, Oklahoma
20th-century Members of the Oklahoma House of Representatives
Democratic Party members of the Oklahoma House of Representatives
University of Oklahoma alumni
20th-century American politicians